Joseph Maxime Joffre Daigle (July 24, 1925 – September 9, 1968) was a Canadian politician. He served in the Legislative Assembly of New Brunswick from 1967 to 1968 as member of the Liberal party.

References

1925 births
1968 deaths